The 1992 United States presidential election in Utah took place on November 7, 1992, and was part of the 1992 United States presidential election. Voters chose five representatives, or electors to the Electoral College, who voted for president and vice president.

Utah was won by President George H. W. Bush (R-TX) by a 16.0 percent margin of victory. This was one of only two states, the other one being Maine, to have Ross Perot (I-TX) come in second place. Unlike Maine, Perot did not win any counties, though he placed second in nineteen of twenty-nine to overcome Bill Clinton (D-AR) in the popular vote. Likewise it was the only time Bill Clinton finished third in a state, in either the 1992 or 1996 election, despite winning two counties. Utah and Maine (the latter of which where Bush finished third behind Perot) in 1992 constitute the last time that any major party candidate has finished third in a state, and the only time in a non-Confederate state since Robert M. La Follette finished ahead of John W. Davis in twelve states in 1924. Utah was Perot’s third-highest vote percentage behind Maine and Alaska, and Bush’s eighth best performance as percent of vote and second best performance as far as margin of victory.

Results

Results by county

Electors
Technically the voters of Utah cast their ballots for electors: representatives to the Electoral College. Utah is allocated five electors because it has three congressional districts and two senators. All candidates who appear on the ballot or qualify to receive write-in votes must submit a list of five electors, who pledge to vote for their candidate and his or her running mate. Whoever wins a plurality of votes in the state is awarded all five electoral votes. Their chosen electors then vote for president and vice president. Although electors are pledged to their candidate and running mate, they are not obligated to vote for them. An elector who votes for someone other than his or her candidate is known as a faithless elector.

The electors of each state and the District of Columbia met in December 1992 to cast their votes for president and vice president. The Electoral College itself never meets as one body. Instead the electors from each state and the District of Columbia met in their respective capitols. 

All electors from Utah were pledged to and voted for George H. W. Bush and Dan Quayle.

See also
 United States presidential elections in Utah
 Presidency of Bill Clinton

Notes

References

Utah
1992
1992 Utah elections